Jeanne Marie Nancy d'Autremont (23 May 1899 – 4 November 1979), née de Martel, was a French chess master. She was three times French Women's Chess Champion (1928, 1929, 1932). She was Women's World Chess Championship participant (1933).

Biography
Originally from Brittany nobility, her father was the commander of a warship. In 1926, she married Lucien Bridet d'Autremont and moved to Paris. Three times she won the French Women's Chess Championship, moreover she always took the second place in these tournaments, but became the champion, because the winner did not have French citizenship. In 1928 and 1929 such a chess player turned out to be Paulette Schwartzmann, and in 1932 – Alice Tonini. She also took third place in the French Women's Chess Championship in 1927 and 1933. In 1933 she participated in the Women's World Chess Championship in Folkestone and took 7th place (tournament won by Vera Menchik).

References

1899 births
1979 deaths
Sportspeople from Brest, France
French female chess players
20th-century chess players
20th-century French women